Malyan is an Armenian surname. It may refer to:

People
David Malyan (1904–1976), Soviet Armenian film and stage actor
Henrik Malyan (1925–1988), Soviet Armenian film director and writer

Places
 Malyan, Fars, Iran

See also
Malian
Maliyan

Armenian-language surnames